Edwin Richard Cooke (26 February 1903 – 24 May 1978) was an English professional footballer who played as a full back in the Football League for Brentford.

Personal life 
Cooke was one of three brothers to play League football.

Career statistics

References

1903 births
1978 deaths
People from Basford, Nottinghamshire
Footballers from Nottinghamshire
Association football fullbacks
English footballers
South Kirkby Colliery F.C. players
Mansfield Town F.C. players
Barnsley F.C. players
Brentford F.C. players
Grantham Town F.C. players
Midland Football League players
English Football League players